The International Association of Language Centres was founded in 1983 as a non-profit organization to accredit and represent independent language schools teaching the official language of their country.

There are currently 118 IALC accredited schools in 21 countries worldwide: Argentina, Australia, Austria, Brazil, Canada, Chile, China, Ecuador, France, Germany, Ireland, Italy, Japan, Malta, New Zealand, Portugal, Russia, South Africa, Spain, United Kingdom, USA. The 9 languages taught by IALC schools are: Chinese (Mandarin), English, French, German, Italian, Japanese, Portuguese, Russian and Spanish.

Since their creation in 1983, IALC have been cementing their reputation as an essential business forum for independently operated language teaching institutions.

The IALC Accreditation
All IALC language schools are inspected prior to joining the association, then they are inspected as part of the Quality Audit every four years, and continuously monitored. Not only does it insist that all member schools are inspected by relevant national accreditation schemes, it also runs its own inspections as part of a thorough quality assurance process. The IALC Code of Ethics is one of the standards that member language schools have to comply with. The IALC Quality Scheme ensures all standards are met and exceeded.

IALC Workshop
The Annual IALC Workshop gathers decision makers from the language travel industry: IALC member schools, and educations agents. It is hosted each year by one of IALC's members and is sponsored by IALC schools and by exhibitors working with the language travel industry. It follows IALC's Annual General Meeting and features seminars, two days of one to one business appointments, and three major evening events: the Welcome Reception, the School Party and the Gala Dinner.

The IALC Workshop is known in the language travel industry as an "essential business forum for independently-operated language teaching institutions". The next IALC Workshop will be held in Seville, Spain. Rhere will be over 4000 pre-scheduled educator and agent appointments, plus many more informal meetings at IALC's unique networking events.

IALC Approved Agencies
IALC Approved Agencies are established, professional, language and study travel agencies. In order to join the scheme, an agency must demonstrate that it has developed successful partnerships with three IALC members in the preceding 12 months before their application.

Notes

External links
 International Association of Language Centres website
 IALC workshop
 IALC overview
 IALC worldwide
 GAELA Associations IALC overview
 BELTA - IALC Overview
 The Times newspaper - feature on IALC
 EL Gazette - Feature on IALC
 The Pie News - feature on the IALC 2013 Workshop
 The Pie News - feature on the IALC 2015 Workshop

Language schools